Antigny is the name or part of the name of the following communes in France:

 Antigny, Vendée, in the Vendée department
 Antigny, Vienne, in the Vienne department
 Antigny-la-Ville, in the Côte-d'Or department